The Singspiel Stakes, is a horse race for horses aged four and over, run at a distance of 1,800 metres (nine furlongs) on turf in January at Meydan Racecourse in Dubai.

The Singspiel Stakes was first contested in 2014 as a Listed race before being elevated to Group 3 class in 2018. It gained Group 2 status in 2020. It is named in honour of the racehorse Singspiel.

Records
Record time:
 1:46.82 - Lord Glitters 2021

Most successful horse:
 2 - Benbatl 2018, 2020
 2 - Lord Glitters 2021, 2022

Most wins by a jockey:
 3 - Christophe Soumillon 2017, 2019, 2020

Most wins by a trainer:
 4 - Saeed bin Suroor 2015, 2018, 2019, 2020

Most wins by an owner:
 4 - Godolphin 2015, 2018, 2019, 2020

Winners

See also
 List of United Arab Emirates horse races

References

Horse races in the United Arab Emirates
Recurring sporting events established in 2014
2014 establishments in the United Arab Emirates
Open mile category horse races